"Can't Stop Lovin' You" is a song by American band Van Halen. It was released in 1995 as the third single from their tenth album Balance. The song emerged after producer Bruce Fairbairn asked for a more pop-oriented song. Instead of searching for his archives, Eddie Van Halen decided to write new music from scratch. The song was written by all members of Van Halen and pays homage to Ray Charles' song "I Can't Stop Loving You", particularly in the line where Sammy Hagar sings "Hey Ray, what you said is true..."

The song was Van Halen's most successful single from Balance in the United States, being the only single that reached the top 40 of the Billboard Hot 100, peaking at number 30. This would be Van Halen's last song to reach the top 40 in the United States. The single also reached number three on the Canadian RPM Top Singles chart and number 33 on the UK Singles Chart.

Music video
The video, directed by Peter Christopherson, is set in an average middle class American home, where it goes back and forth between the band performing the song and people showing their affection for one another, from an old couple celebrating their anniversary, to a teen couple, to a boy and his dog, to a woman and her pet monkey. There is also a moving moment in the video in which a girl mourns the loss of her dog.

In the beginning of the video, it shows a man taking a gun and his wife worried. In the end, the video shows his wife and his son waiting for him as he leaves the prison. What he did and his time in prison are shown in the video of the song "Don't Tell Me (What Love Can Do)".

Legacy
The song was performed considerably on the 1995 Ambulance Tour with Sammy Hagar. It was featured on both Van Halen compilations Best Of – Volume I and The Best of Both Worlds.

Track listings
US CD and 7-inch single
 "Can't Stop Lovin' You" (album version) – 4:08
 "Crossing Over" – 5:04

UK, European, and Australian maxi-single
 "Can't Stop Lovin' You" – 4:07
 "Crossing Over" – 5:03
 "Right Now" (live) – 6:08
 "Man on a Mission" (live) – 4:58

Japanese CD single
 "Can't Stop Lovin' You"
 "Big Fat Money"
 "Baluchitherium"

Charts

Weekly charts

Year-end charts

Release history

References

1995 singles
1995 songs
Song recordings produced by Bruce Fairbairn
Songs written by Alex Van Halen
Songs written by Eddie Van Halen
Songs written by Michael Anthony (musician)
Songs written by Sammy Hagar
Van Halen songs
Warner Records singles